Sunland is a former settlement in Inyo County, California. It lay at an elevation of 4209 feet (1283 m).

References

Former settlements in Inyo County, California
Former populated places in California